"Leather So Soft" is the second single from Birdman and Lil Wayne's album Like Father, Like Son. The single peaked at 18 on the Bubbling Under Hot 100 chart. The video features an off key guitar solo from Lil Wayne at the end. The end of the video has some scenes (beginning at 2:55) with a deaf interpreter.

Despite not charting on the Billboard Hot 100 the single was still certified platinum by the RIAA.

Charts

Certifications

References

Birdman (rapper) songs
Lil Wayne songs
2006 singles
Cash Money Records singles
Song recordings produced by Jim Jonsin
Songs written by Jim Jonsin